Greenwood Cemetery is privately owned non-denominational cemetery located in the Uptown neighborhood of Dallas, Texas. Founded in 1875 as the Trinity Cemetery, the first burial was a Mrs. Susan Bradford that March. At the time, the cemetery was out of town and surrounded by farmland. By 1896, the cemetery had fallen into disrepair with one local noting: "The fence is down in twenty places, cattle roam all over the graves and wagons use the main street as a common thoroughfare." This prompted the formation of the Greenwood Cemetery Association which took over the maintenance and operation of the cemetery and gave it its current name.

Notable burials

 Vivian Louise Aunspaugh (1869–1960), painter and art teacher
Jacob Boll (1828–1880), naturalist and entomologist
 John Henry Brown (1820–1895), newspaper publisher and member of the Texas legislature
 Nathaniel Macon Burford (1824–1898), politician, Speaker of the Texas House of Representatives
 Robert Emmet Burke (1847–1901), US Congressman
 Ben E. Cabell (1858–1931), mayor of Dallas
 William Lewis Cabell (1827–1911), mayor of Dallas
 John Riley Duncan (1850–1911), Texas Ranger and Bounty Hunter
 J. M. Howell (1849–1925), Dallas city alderman
 Levin Major Lewis (1832–1886), Confederate army general
 Benjamin Long (1838–1877), mayor of Dallas
 William Stewart Simkins (1842–1929), Confederate soldier purported to have fired first shot of Civil War
 Christopher Columbus Slaughter (1837–1919), American rancher, banker and philanthropist
 J. M. Thurmond (1836–1882), attorney and mayor of Dallas
 John H. Traylor (1839–1925), politician, developer, mayor of Dallas
 Alexander White (1816–1893), US Congressman from Alabama
 Frank W. Wozencraft (1892–1966), mayor of Dallas

References

Cemeteries in Dallas
Cemeteries established in the 1870s
1875 establishments in Texas